Tianma ("heavenly horse") was a winged flying horse in Chinese folklore. It was sometimes depicted with chimerical features such as dragon scales and was at times attributed the ability to sweat blood, possibly inspired by the parasite Parafilaria multipapillosa, which infected the highly sought-after Ferghana horse (大宛馬), sometimes conflated with Tianma.

In the Western Zhou Empire, Tianma referred to a constellation. Tianma is also associated with Emperor Wu of Han, an aficionado of the Central Asian horse, and the famous poet Li Bo. The bronze statue Gansu Flying Horse is a well-known example.

See also
Horse in Chinese mythology
Shanghai Tianma Circuit
Han–Xiongnu War

References

 

Chinese legendary creatures
Horses in Chinese mythology
Horses in mythology
Winged horses